Callaway High School may refer to:

Callaway High School (Georgia), Hogansville, Georgia
Callaway High School (Mississippi), Jackson, Mississippi
Callaway High School (Nebraska), Callaway, Nebraska